Lee Evans (born 24 July 1994) is a Welsh professional footballer who plays as a midfielder for League One club Ipswich Town and the Wales national football team.

Evans started his senior career at hometown club Newport County, having previously spent time in the youth systems at Bristol Rovers and Malpas FC. He made his debut for Newport in March 2012 at the age of 17. During his time at Newport, he helped the club to the 2012 FA Trophy Final and promotion to the Football League through the Conference Premier play-offs in 2013. He joined Wolverhampton Wanderers in 2013, making his Football League debut in August 2013. He helped Wolves to win the League One title during his first season at the club in 2013–14. He spent five years at Wolverhampton Wanderers, spending time on loan at Bradford City and Wigan Athletic, helping the later to win the League One title in 2017–18. In January 2018 he joined Sheffield United. He joined former club Wigan Athletic on loan in August 2018, before signing permanently for the club in January 2019. He spent the following three seasons at Wigan before joining Ipswich Town in June 2021.

He featured for Wales at Semi-Pro level in 2012, whilst also winning caps for the Wales U21 team between 2013 and 2016. In November 2017, Evans made his debut for the senior Wales national team.

Club career

Newport County
Having been released by Bristol Rovers as a 15-year-old, Evans began his professional career at his hometown club Newport County, for whom he made his senior league debut aged 17 on 20 March 2012 in a 1–1 draw at Cambridge United. After only three Conference Premier appearances, he ended the season playing in the FA Trophy Final on 12 May at Wembley Stadium, where Newport lost 0–2 to York City.

During the following season, in which the club would ultimately regain its Football League status after a 25-year absence, Evans became a regular starting player in the Newport team, making 25 appearances in all competitions, scoring 3 goals.

Wolverhampton Wanderers
In January 2013, Evans signed a -year deal with Wolverhampton Wanderers, then of the Championship, for an undisclosed transfer fee, reported to be £200,000. Having spent the remainder of the 2012–13 season that saw Wolves relegated to League One as part of their youth development squad, he was identified over the summer by new manager Kenny Jackett to become part of his plans for the first-team.

The midfielder made his club and Football League debut on 3 August 2013 in a goalless draw against Preston North End. He scored his first goal for the club a week later when he netted in a 4–0 win against Gillingham. He made 28 appearances during his first full season at Wolves, helping the team on to win the 2013–14 Football League One title.

He continued to feature for the Wolverhampton Wanderers first-team following promotion to the Championship. He made his Championship debut on the opening day of the season, starting in a 1–0 win against Norwich City. He scored his first goal of the season on 28 September in a 3–3 draw with Reading. Evans made 21 appearances during the 2014–15 season, scoring once.

After returning from his loan spell at Bradford City, Evans featured for Wolves during the 2016–17 season, making 18 appearances in all competitions over the course of the season. In February 2017, he signed a three-and-a-half year contract extension at Molineux until 2020.

Bradford City (loan)
On 20 August 2015, Evans signed for Bradford City on loan from Wolves, initially until 9 January 2016. He made his debut for Bradford in a 0–0 draw with Barnsley on 22 August 2015. He scored his first goal for the club on 3 October, netting the opening goal in a 3–1 away win against Rochdale. In January, Evans' loan at Bradford was extended until the end of the season. He became a key part of the Bradford City side during the season, scoring 4 goals in 41 appearances in all competitions and helping Bradford to reach the League One play-offs following a 5th placed finish.

Wigan Athletic (loan)
On 31 July 2017, Evans completed a season-long loan to League One side Wigan Athletic. He made his debut for Wigan on the opening day of the season in a 1–0 win against Milton Keynes Dons. He scored his first goal for Wigan in a 4–1 win against Bury on 13 August 2017. He went on to make 23 appearances and score 3 goals before being recalled from his loan spell by his parent club Wolverhampton Wanderers at the beginning of the January transfer window.

Sheffield United
On 10 January 2018, Evans joined Championship club Sheffield United for an undisclosed fee, reported to be around £750,000. He made his debut for Sheffield United on 20 January in a 2–1 win against Norwich City. He scored his first goals for the club on 10 April, netting a brace in a 2–1 win against Middlesbrough. He made 19 appearances for Sheffield United during the second-half of the 2017–18 season, scoring twice.

Return to Wigan Athletic
On 10 August 2018, Evans joined fellow Championship club Wigan Athletic on loan. He featured regularly for Wigan during the first-half of the season, making 20 appearances before signing permanently for the club on 1 January 2019. He made a total of 35 appearances for Wigan during the 2018–19 season, scoring once.

Evans continued to feature as a first-team regular during the 2019–20 season, scoring his first goal of the season on the opening day of the campaign, scoring the winning goal in a 3–2 home win against Cardiff City. He scored 2 goals in 33 appearances for Wigan throughout the course of the season, as the club suffered relegation to League One due to a points deduction, despite a midtable league finish in the regular season.

Following Wigan's relegation to League One, the club was placed into administration. Despite this, Evans was one of the few senior players to remain at the Wigan. He started the season as a regular in the first-team, before suffering a knee injury in December which required surgery. He returned from injury in March, going on to score 2 goals in 24 appearances over the course of the season to help Wigan avoid relegation.

Ipswich Town
On 4 June 2021, Evans joined Ipswich Town on a three-year deal, reuniting with his former manager Paul Cook. He made his debut for Ipswich on the opening day of the 2021–22 season in a 2–2 home draw against Morecambe at Portman Road. On 28 September 2021, Evans scored his first career hat-trick in a 6–0 home win against  Doncaster Rovers. He captained Ipswich during the early months of the season, before his former teammate Sam Morsy took the armband full-time after being named as club captain in October.

International career
Having previously played 2 matches for the Wales Semi-pro team in 2012, Evans made his debut for the Wales under-21 team on 6 September 2013 against San Marino. On 5 September 2014, Evans scored his first goal for Wales under-21 in a 2–2 draw with Finland.

On 1 October 2014 Evans received his first call-up to the Wales senior national team along with 5 other uncapped players. He made his senior debut for Wales on 14 November 2017 as a second-half substitute during a 1–1 draw with Panama at the Cardiff City Stadium. He made his first start for Wales on 20 March 2019 in a 1–0 win against Trinidad and Tobago at the Racecourse Ground.

Career statistics

Club

International

Honours
Newport County
FA Trophy runner-up: 2011–12

Wolverhampton Wanderers
Football League One: 2013–14

Wigan Athletic
EFL League One: 2017–18

References

External links
Lee Evans profile at the Ipswich Town F.C. website

1994 births
Living people
Footballers from Newport, Wales
Welsh footballers
Wales under-21 international footballers
Wales international footballers
Association football midfielders
Newport County A.F.C. players
Wolverhampton Wanderers F.C. players
Bradford City A.F.C. players
Wigan Athletic F.C. players
Sheffield United F.C. players
Ipswich Town F.C. players
National League (English football) players
English Football League players